Spector is a company producing bass guitars.

Spector or Spektor may also refer to:

People with the surname
 Alfred Spector (born 1954), Vice President of Research and Special Initiatives at Google
 Art Spector (1920–1987), American basketball player
 Baylon Spector (born 1998), American football player
 David Spector (disambiguation)
 Iftach Spector (born 1940), Israeli brigadier general
 Douglas Spector, plaintiff in Spector v. Norwegian Cruise Line Ltd.
 Jonathan Spector (born 1986), American soccer player
 Maurice Spector, former chairman of the Communist Party of Canada
 Morgan Spector, American actor
 Norman Spector, Canadian journalist, diplomat, civil servant, and newspaper publisher
 Phil Spector (1939–2021), American music producer
 Ronnie Spector (1943–2022), American singer from the Ronettes
 Tim Spector (born 1958), British epidemiologist and science writer
 Warren Spector, American computer game designer
 Yiftah Spector, Israeli former brigadier general
 Regina Spektor, Russian-American singer-songwriter
 Yitzchak Elchanan Spektor, Russian orthodox rabbi

Other uses
Art, entertainment, and media
Spector (band), an indie-rock band from London
John-Paul Denton, British DJ and producer who has recorded under the name Spector
Doctor Spektor, a comic book character
Marc Spector, the alias of Marvel Comics character Moon Knight
Paul Peter (aka Peter Baldwin), Sally Ann, Olivia, and Liam Spector; fictitious characters on the BBC crime series The Fall

Computing and technology
 Veriato, formerly known as SpectorSoft, a company that develops spyware

See also
 Spectra (disambiguation)
 Spectre (disambiguation) (also includes Specter)
 Spectrum (disambiguation)

Jewish surnames